Lloyd K. Parrott is a Newfoundland 
Canadian politician, who was elected to the Newfoundland and Labrador House of Assembly in the 2019 provincial election. He represents the electoral district of Terra Nova as a member of the Newfoundland and Labrador Progressive Conservative Party. He was re-elected in the 2021 provincial election.

Parrott grew up in Wabush, Labrador and moved to Clarenville in 2011. Parrott is a former member of the Clarenville town council (2017-2019). He is a retired member of the military, and has served on various boards in the province, including the Hebron Project Employers Association, Construction Labour Relations Association of N.L., Alpine Development Alliance Corp. and a trustee of the Teamsters Union in N.L. On July 4, 2022, Parrott announced he would be a candidate in the 2023 provincial PC leadership election.

Election results

References

Living people
Progressive Conservative Party of Newfoundland and Labrador MHAs
21st-century Canadian politicians
Year of birth missing (living people)